The dissolution of Russia is a hypothetical unraveling of the Russian Federation from a unified state to various potential independent successor states. The term is used in academic literature and journalism in discussions about Russian statehood and challenges that are perceived to threaten the unity and integrity of the Russian state.

The current Russian Federation is considered the primary successor state of the Soviet Union. Various trends and problems which may challenge the permanence of the unified Russian Federation have been discussed publicly and in academia by figures such as Garry Kasparov, Mikhail Leontyev, Herman Gref, Maxim Kalashnikov, Sergey Kurginyan, Alexander Prokhanov, Natalya Narochnitskaya, and Dmitry Medvedev.

Historical precedents

Russian Empire 

British historian Geoffrey Hosking believes that the policy of the authorities of the Russian Empire included Russification, which contributed to the centralization of power and the elimination of local privileges. In his opinion, Russification was also aimed at giving all the peoples of the Russian Empire a sense of belonging to Russia, its past and traditions. The active Russification of the Western ethnic suburbs began in the first half of the 19th century and intensified in the 1860s after the latest Polish uprising. However, instead of a unifying factor, this policy, on the contrary, harmed the image of Russia. As a result, the loyalty of minorities (within the Russian Empire) fell even more, stimulating their national liberation movements, which did not contribute to either calmness or unity of the population within the empire. In fact it even antagonized previously friendly peoples towards the Tsarist government, which became one of the reasons for the future collapse of the Russian Empire.

The ideologists of Siberian regionalism (mid-1850s – early 20th century) considered Siberians to be a separate people from ethnic Russians. Among scientists there are both opponents and supporters of this point of view. 1918 saw the short-term formation of the Siberian Republic as a formal state.

The first disintegration of Russia occurred in 1917. After the February Revolution, active processes of disintegration began, taking place in the economic, social, and sociopolitical spheres, which eventually led to the termination of the existence of a single state. The Russian Civil War ended with the creation of the USSR, the loss of Moldova, which was annexed by Romania, and the recognition of the independence of the former Russian territories: Finland, Poland, Estonia, Latvia, Lithuania and the Tuvan People's Republic.

Soviet Union 

In the Soviet Union, on the one hand, the number of national-territorial entities grew, and their status increased, but on the other hand, the process of centralization took place. From the mid-1920s, in the national regions of the USSR, korenization was carried out, which meant the introduction of national-territorial languages and national cadres into state and social life in order to develop national identity. This process also contributed to the growth of regional nationalism struggling with "great power", which led to the development of centrifugal tendencies. At the end of the 1930s (particularly in 1932–1933), korenization was curtailed, and many of its active participants were repressed. The widespread introduction of the Russian language as the language of interethnic communication has largely supplanted local languages.

Russian Federation 

In 1991, the USSR collapsed into 15 republics: Estonia, Latvia, Lithuania, Belarus, Ukraine, Moldova, Russia, Georgia, Armenia, Azerbaijan, Kazakhstan, Kyrgyzstan, Uzbekistan, Turkmenistan and Tajikistan. These became independent states, and many further became the Commonwealth of Independent States.

Chechnya and Tatarstan sought independence from the Russian Federation in 1994. Agreement with Tatarstan, resulting in a bilateral treaty, was reached and the republic remained part of the Russian Federation. Conflict with Chechnya escalated into the First Chechen War after Russian troops were deployed in the republic in December 1994.

Shapes of Russian statehood 

Pressures that could lead to the dissolution of Russia, and concerns for preserving the integrity of the state, provide evidence that the current Russian statehood may not be the optimal form of the Russian state. The discussion about the future of Russian statehood is centered around the transformation that the Russian state has been undergoing since the dissolution of the Soviet Union. Whether Russia becomes a nation state, or a highly centralised imperial state, is the primary focus of this debate.

Some scholars see Russia as being in the process of transforming from an imperial state towards a nation state, seeing it either as a desired path towards building a civil society (Yevgeny Yasin) or the inevitable and irreversible breaking up of an empire (Dmitri Trenin).

Others, such as Vladimir Shevchenko, consider a centralised empire-like form of the state to be preferable. Shevchenko considers that there is a fundamental reason why Russia has been a self-regenerating empire for centuries, gravitating towards an imperial state, and morphing from the Russian Empire to the USSR's "Red Empire" most recently.

Possible causes of decay

As discussed by Vladimir Shevchenko 

The chief researcher of the Institute of Philosophy, Russian Academy of Sciences, Vladimir Shevchenko, when reviewing the article "The collapse of Russia in the early 21st century in the statements of contemporaries" by O. Yu. Maslova, noted that it contains a large collection of authors on the theme of Russian disintegration. These authors range from diehard supporters of the idea that the collapse of Russia is almost inevitable and has already begun, to supporters of the idea of artificial and deliberate attempts at making the country collapse. 

The main reason for the disintegration processes and the possible collapse of Russia, according to Shevchenko's review work, "The Future of Russia: Strategies for philosophical Understanding," is the lack of a national idea or project (such as Communism in the Soviet Union) that would unite all peoples of Russia. Russian statehood, as he sees it, is in a transitional state in which all processes have become more active: both integration and disintegration.

He went on to list the accompanying reasons for Russia's possible collapse as:

 xenophobic sentiments ("Russia for Russians"),
 the separatist tendencies of minority ethnic groups in Russia, and
 the transformation of the republics of Russia into full-fledged States.

In his article, he opposes the opinion that the disintegration had already begun, stressing that issues such as legal extraterritoriality, instances of discrimination of non-titular ethnicity in republican governments, and the radicalization of Islam exist.

Other Russian sources and reasons 

In the late 1990s and early 2000s, the Russian government forbade Tatarstan from switching from the Cyrillic script to the Latin alphabet, fearing that such a move would disrupt internal unity and result in dissolution. On the other hand, in the 2020s, Kazakhstan, an independent country formed after the dissolution of the Soviet Union, began moving towards the Latin alphabet, and this is believed to be to distance itself from Russian influence. The Russian government strives to make all of the languages of Russia use Cyrillic to enforce unity.

In a report to the conservative think tank Izborsky club, a group of analysts led by A. Kobyakov, listed the lines of division in modern Russian society that could potentially lead to the collapse of the state: socio-economic inequality, interethnic relations, alienation of elites from the people, and opposition of the "creative class" to the rest of society.

The culturologist I. Yakovenko believes that the main reason for the disintegration processes is the uneven process of market modernization in different regions of Russia, which increases the economic isolation of these regions from one another. Yakovenko identifies the following regions into which in his opinion the Russian Federation may break up: North and South of Russia, Siberia, the North Caucasus and the intercontinental border.

According to the mathematician , there are some possible reasons for the collapse of Russia:

 the large difference between the income levels of different social strata
 the large economic gap between different regions of Russia
 the complexity of communications between different regions of the country because of infrastructure underdevelopment
 the breakdown of generations
 the strengthening of existing schisms in a religious, cultural and national context, and
 the strengthening of the power of local regional leaders.

Democratic values 
Widely criticized for being antisemitic and an extreme nationalist, Igor Shafarevich wrote the 1981 essay Russophobia in which he blamed "Jews seeking world rule". He alleged a "vast conspiracy against Russia and all mankind" and that they seek the destruction of Russia through adoption of a Western-style democracy.

Peter Eltsov, professor at National Defense University (United States), argued that Russia cannot survive as a "true liberal democracy" and "would probably disintegrate" if it were to embrace Western values.

Irredentism 

As in any country with land borders, there are many ethnicities living in Russia related or identical to the titular ethnic groups of neighboring countries. In some of these border regions, irredentist ideas are expressed about the reunification of divided peoples.

In Buryatia and two Buryat autonomous okrugs, one of which is the Ust-Orda Buryat Okrug, ideas are being expressed of joining Mongolia as part of the idea of pan-Mongolism.

Some Kazakh nationalists wish to recover Orenburg, the former capital of the Kazakh Autonomous Socialist Soviet Republic, and now part of Russia in the Orenburg Oblast.

The idea of uniting Finland and Karelia into a Greater Finland (the Karelian question) used to be popular among part of the population in Finland and Karelia.

Consequences of the 2022 Russian invasion of Ukraine 

The post-WW2 sphere of influence (the Eastern Bloc and the Warsaw Pact) collapsed in 1991 with the aforementioned dissolution of the Soviet Union. The dissolution was largely non-violent, though it has been argued that the violence of Russia's invasion of Ukraine (February 2022) resulted from the Soviet dissolution. In 2022, within weeks of this invasion, some commentators predicted an eventual Russian collapse as a result, especially once it became obvious that Vladimir Putin's "special military operation" was not going to be a quick victory. Some have been more specific, and have stated such a collapse could happen by 2025–2027.

In May 2022, US journalist Casey Michel called for the "decolonization" of Russia. In his view, the dissolution of the former Soviet Union should be continued, to end the rule of Moscow over the republics of Russia. Weeks later the Commission on Security and Cooperation in Europe held an event discussing "the need to 'decolonize' Russia" because of "Russia's barbaric war on Ukraine", as they put it, calling for a conversation about Russia's "interior empire" and noting "Moscow's dominion over many indigenous non-Russian nations".

Despite this, the Freedom of Russia Legion opposes any collapse of Russia.

Opinions on the consequences of a Russian breakup 
In an interview with the magazine Expert in April 2005, the head of the presidential administration, Dmitry Medvedev, said:

In 2011, during a meeting of the government commission for the development of the North Caucasian Federal District in Gudermes, Vladimir Putin said that if the Caucasus were to suddenly leave Russia:

See also
 Russification
 Derussification
 Autonomous administrative divisions of Russia
 
 List of national border changes (1914–present)

Europe
 List of active separatist movements in Europe

Central Europe 
 Kaliningrad question

Eastern Europe 
 Tatarstan

Caucasus region 
 Mountainous Republic of the Northern Caucasus (1917–1922)
 Caucasus Emirate (2007–2016)
 Ajnad al-Kavkaz (2015–)
 Insurgency in the North Caucasus (2009–2017)

Asia
 Indigenous peoples of Siberia
 Soviet invasion of South Sakhalin
 Kuril Islands dispute
 Secession in China
 List of active separatist movements in Asia
 Sino-Soviet border conflict

References

Further reading
  — views of a prominent supporter (Boris Akunin) of the view that no good model for Russian state exists
  (translated) — views of a prominent Russian government official
  (available copy )

External links
Is Russia's collapse inevitable?
Возможны ли распад или сжатие России?

Separatism in Russia
Russia
Public policy proposals